The JGR Class 2120 was a B6 type 0-6-2 steam tank locomotive used on Japanese Government Railways for shunting and pulling freight cars. The earliest locomotives of this type were imported from Great Britain. One is preserved at the Ome Railway Park in Ome, Tokyo.

During the Russo-Japanese War, the Imperial Japanese Army captured the southern portion of the Russian-owned Chinese Eastern Railway. The Japanese converted the lines under their control to Japanese 1,067 mm gauge, and sent 187 Class 2120 locomotives to the newly established South Manchuria Railway (Mantetsu) in 1905. However, in 1908, Mantetsu completed the conversion of its lines to standard gauge, rendering these locomotives useless. Five were sent directly to the Taiwan Government Railway, and the rest were returned to Japan. The Taiwan Government Railway eventually received a further ten, where they became class CK80.

Same type locomotives were also built in Germany and United States. They were called Class 2400 and Class 2500.

See also
 Japan Railways locomotive numbering and classification

References

0-6-2T locomotives
Steam locomotives of Japan
Steam locomotives of China
Steam locomotives of Taiwan
1067 mm gauge locomotives of Japan
Preserved steam locomotives of Japan
Freight locomotives
NBL locomotives